Conasprella burckhardti is an extinct species of sea snail, a marine gastropod mollusk in the family Conidae, the cone snails and their allies.

Description
The length of the shell attains 31 mm.

Distribution
Fossils of this marine species were found in Miocene and Pliocene strata in the following locations:the Gatun Formation, Panama, Colombia, Ecuador, Venezuela, Costa Rica and in Mexico; age rangez: 11.608 to 2.588 Ma.

References

 E. Bose. 1906. Sobre algunas faunas terciarias. Boletin del Instituto Geologico de Mexico
 A. A. Olsson. 1922. The Miocene of Northern Costa Rica. Bulletins of American Paleontology 9(39):1-309
 W. P. Woodring. 1970. Geology and paleontology of canal zone and adjoining parts of Panama: Description of Tertiary mollusks (gastropods: Eulimidae, Marginellidae to Helminthoglyptidae). United States Geological Survey Professional Paper 306(D):299–452 
 Hendricks J. R. (2018). Diversity and preserved shell coloration patterns of Miocene Conidae (Neogastropoda) from an exposure of the Gatun Formation, Colón Province, Panama. Journal of Paleontology. 10.1017/jpa.2017.153: 34 pp

External links
 Conus Biodiversity website: Conus burckhardti
 Fossilshells.nl: image

burckhardti 
Gastropods described in 1906